William J. Edwards may refer to:

Jack Edwards (American politician) (1928–2019), U.S. Republican politician, represented Alabama in the U.S. House of Representatives 1965–1985
William J. Edwards (architect), who designed Washington School (Grand Forks, North Dakota)
William James Edwards, founder of Snow Hill Normal and Industrial Institute and author of Twenty-Five Years in the Black Belt

See also
William Edwards (disambiguation)